Hugo Valdir Romão Cardoso (born 1 January 1984), known as Valdir, is a Portuguese retired footballer who played as a left back.

Club career
Born in Olhão, Algarve, Valdir finished his formation with Sporting CP, but could only appear as a senior for their reserves. After two loans, at A.D. Ovarense and C.F. Estrela da Amadora, making his Primeira Liga debut with the latter club, he was released in June 2006.

Subsequently, Valdir represented Associação Naval 1º de Maio, F.C. Paços de Ferreira and Rio Ave F.C. in his country, always being second or third-choice in his position. He spent the second part of the 2008–09 campaign abroad, with Standard Liège, meeting the same fate – no appearances whatsoever.

In the summer of 2009, Valdir joined top division team Rio Ave F.C., only appearing once for the Vila do Conde side in competitive matches in two seasons combined (73 minutes in a 1–5 league home loss against S.C. Olhanense, on 28 March 2010).

References

External links

1984 births
Living people
People from Olhão
Portuguese footballers
Association football defenders
Primeira Liga players
Liga Portugal 2 players
Segunda Divisão players
Sporting CP B players
A.D. Ovarense players
C.F. Estrela da Amadora players
Associação Naval 1º de Maio players
F.C. Paços de Ferreira players
Rio Ave F.C. players
Standard Liège players
Girabola players
C.R.D. Libolo players
Portugal youth international footballers
Portugal under-21 international footballers
Portuguese expatriate footballers
Expatriate footballers in Belgium
Expatriate footballers in Angola
Sportspeople from Faro District